Lindolfo Delgado Garza (born 31 December 1994) is a Mexican professional boxer. As an amateur he competed in the men's lightweight event at the 2016 Summer Olympics.

Professional boxing record

References

External links
 
 

1994 births
Living people
Mexican male boxers
Light-welterweight boxers
Olympic boxers of Mexico
Boxers at the 2016 Summer Olympics
Lightweight boxers
Pan American Games silver medalists for Mexico
Boxers at the 2015 Pan American Games
Pan American Games medalists in boxing
Central American and Caribbean Games silver medalists for Mexico
Competitors at the 2014 Central American and Caribbean Games
Boxers from Nuevo León
Central American and Caribbean Games medalists in boxing
Medalists at the 2015 Pan American Games